Shih Chien University (USC) is a private university in Taipei and Kaohsiung, Taiwan. 

It is considered one of the top schools in the field of Art & Design in Taiwan and the world and ranked no. 7 for internationalization in the 2018 Taiwan university ranking by Global Views. Its professional performance and courses in design have led to its inclusion among the "60 top D-schools in the world" by BusinessWeek in 2006. The School of Art & Design was ranked among the top 100–150 in the world by the QS World University Rankings.. It has two campuses: one in Dazhi, Zhongshan District, Taipei and the other in Neimen District, Kaohsiung.

History
It was established in 1958 by Hsieh Tung-min. Formerly known as the Shih Chien School of Home Economics. In 1979 the school was renamed the Shih Chien School of Home Economics and Economics, in 1991 the school was upgraded to become the Shih Chien College of Design and Management. In 1997 the school was again upgraded to become Shih Chien University.

Organization
Taipei Campus; Kaohsiung Campus
College of Human Ecology
Department of Food and Beverage Management
Department of Social Work
Department of Music
Department of Family Studies and Child Development
Department of Food Science, Nutrition, and Nutraceutical Biotechnology
College of Design
Department of Fashion Design
Department of Architecture
Department of Industrial Design
Department of Communication Design
College of Management
Graduate Institute of Creative Industries
Department of Business Administration
Department of Information Technology and Management
Department of Finance and Banking
Department of Risk Management and Insurance
Department of International Business
Department of Accounting
Department of Applied Foreign Languages
College of Business and Information
Department of Accounting Information System
Department of International Business Management
Department of International Trade
Department of Marketing Management
Department of Finance
Department of Information Management
Department of Information Technology and Communication
Department of Computer Simulation and Design
College of Culture and Creativity
Bachelor Program in Computer Animation
Department of Tourism Management
Department of Recreation Management
Department of Fashion Design and Merchandising
Department of Fashion Styling and Design Communication
Department of Applied English
Department of Applied Chinese
Department of Applied Japanese

Research Units 
Taipei Campus; Kaohsiung Campus
College of Human Ecology
Research Center for Early Care
College of Design
Studio for Design Psychology
College of Management
Research Center for Financial Development
Cardif Bank Research Center for Insurance

Other education facilities
Taipei Campus; Kaohsiung Campus
Kindergarten

Notable alumni
 Ko Chia-yen, actress
 Summer Meng, actress
 Ashin, singer

Sister schools
Saimaa University of Applied Sciences, Finland
Hanze University of Applied Sciences, Groningen, the Netherlands
University of Applied Sciences Würzburg-Schweinfurt, Germany
Northumbria University, UK
University of Cumbria, UK
Kwantlen Polytechnic University, Canada
University of Wisconsin-River Falls, USA
Dallas Baptist University, USA
RMIT University, Australia
Unitec Institute of Technology, New Zealand
University of California, Davis, USA

Transportation
The university Taipei campus is accessible within walking distance North from Dazhi Station of the Taipei Metro.

See also
 List of universities in Taiwan
U12 Consortium

References

External links

Taipei Campus, Shih Chien University
Kaohsiung Campus, Shih Chien University
Shih Chien University (English)

 
1958 establishments in Taiwan
Educational institutions established in 1958
Universities and colleges in Taiwan
Universities and colleges in Taipei
Comprehensive universities in Taiwan